Hanoch Levin (December 18, 1943 – August 18, 1999) was an Israeli dramatist, theater director, author and poet, best known for his plays. His absurdist style is often compared to the work of Harold Pinter and Samuel Beckett.

Biography 

Levin was born in 1943 to Malka and Israel Levin, who immigrated to then-British Mandate of Palestine in 1935 (now Israel) from Łódź, Poland. He grew up in a religious Jewish home in the Neve Sha'anan neighborhood in southern Tel Aviv. His father ran a grocery store.

As a child, he attended the Yavetz State Religious School.  In the 1950s, his brother, David, who was nine years older than he was, worked as an assistant director at the Cameri Theater. His father died of a heart attack when he was 12 years old. Hanoch attended Zeitlin Religious High School in Tel Aviv. After ninth grade, he left school to help support the family. He worked as a messenger boy for the Herut company and took classes at a night school for working youth at the Ironi Aleph middle school. There he joined a drama club and acted in Michal, Daughter of Saul by Aharon Ashman.

After serving his compulsory military duty as a code clerk in the signal corps, Levin began to study philosophy and Hebrew literature at Tel Aviv University (1964–67). In 1965 he joined the editorial board of the Dorban newspaper, one of the university's two student newspapers. Some passages from the period were republished, with thorough revisions, as part of his later work. For example, "A Hardened Ballad of a Soldier Man and Woman" from June 1966 was revised as "Black Eagle on a Red Roof" and published after the 1982 Lebanon War.

During his university studies, Levin associated with the Communist Party, where he met Danny Tracz, the dramatist of the Communist youth. A friendship and professional kinship developed between the two that lasted beyond the period of their party activities.

Levin was married twice, to Naava Koresh and Edna Koren. His partner in the last years of his life was actress and dubber Lillian Barto. He had four children.

Levin was known for his refusal to give interviews. In one of the few interviews that he gave at the beginning of his career (to Michael Handelzalts from Israel Defense Forces Radio), he answered the question "Why do you write specifically for the theater?":" I just think, the theater, it's much more charming, much more involving when you see these things on the stage. It's just much more exciting, I don't know why... you see the world, that way, formed on the stage. I don't know whether the material takes on a different quality, or it's better or worse, but in any case for me it's more exciting, material that's produced on the stage."

Levin died of prostate cancer on August 18, 1999. He continued to work even in the hospital, nearly to his last day, but didn't have time to finish the staging of his play The Crybabies. During his lifetime he composed 63 plays and directed 22 of them.

Literary and theater career
In 1967, Levin published a poem called "Birkot ha-Shahar" (the name of the Jewish "dawn blessings") in the literary journal Yochani, and was met with critical acclaim. The poem was later reprinted in his poetry collection Life of the Dead. In Haaretz he published the stories "Stubborn Dina" (1966) and "Pshishpsh" (1971, also published in the book The Eternal Invalid and the Beloved), as well as the verse cycles "Party Song of the Wicked: An Idyll" (1968, later appeared in Life of the Dead) and "Flawed People" (1970). Following Meir Wieseltier's invitations, he began in 1971 to publish stories, poems, and verse in the literary journal Exclamation Point (סימן קריאה): "The World of the Sycophantes" in 1973, "A Hunchback Finds a Prostitute" in 1976, "Life of the Dead" in 1981, and others.

Also in 1967, Levin sent a radio play called Catch the Spy to a radio drama competition at Kol Israel, winning first prize. The show, under the direction of David Levin, was broadcast several times. Levin's translation into English won first prize in 1969 in a radio drama competition in Italy. It was later published in the book Finale.

In 1967–70, Levin devoted himself to political satire. In March 1968 he began working on a cabaret show entitled You, Me and the Next War, with Edna Shavit. The show was mounted in August 1968 at the Bar-Barim club in Tel Aviv by four of Shavit's students from the theatre department at Tel Aviv University: Bat-Sheva Zeisler, Shifra Milstein, Gad Keynar and Rami Peleg.  Danny Tracz was the producer. Next, Levin wrote a satire called Ketchup. Under the direction of his brother, David, it was performed in the basement of the Satirical Cabaret in Tel Aviv in March 1969. In these two works, Levin mocked Israeli military pathos (as in the parody "Victory Parade for the 11 Minutes War" of the victory speech by General Shmuel Gonen at the close of the Six-Day War), the impotence and complacency of Israel's politicians ("Peace Talks in the Middle East"), and presented a macabre treatment of bereavement ("Squares in the Cemetery").

The criticism directed at Levin following You, and Me and the Next War and Ketchup deepened after the premiere of his third political play, Queen of a Bathtub ("מלכת אמבטיה), produced by the Cameri Theater in April 1970. David Levin directed the controversial play, which made pointed use of vulgarity, and contained provocative sketches such as "The Binding" in which Isaac begs his father Abraham not to hesitate to slaughter him, and "The Courting" which mocks Israeli volubility and arrogance. Perhaps because it was presented on the stage of an established theater, the play aroused an unprecedented storm of public opinion. Viewers protested and made a disturbance during the performances. The National Religious Party demanded censorship of a song that, in its opinion, profaned the honor of the Bible. The government threatened to withdraw its financial support from the theater. The criticism further addressed the play itself: "a combination of flawed dialogues and ditties attempting to toss salt on our open wounds" (Dr. Haim Gamzu); "This 'theatrash' (mahazevel) makes us all out to be despicable killers, citizens of a militarist, money-grabbing state." (Uri Porat); and "a scene about a reporter, who comes to interview a young widow whose husband died in the trenches, and plays at love with her, only a demonic or infirm mind could devise... it's a malicious abuse of thousands of bereaved parents" (Reuven Yanai). In spite of Levin's objections, the theater's management decided, in the wake of these outraged responses, to close the show after only nineteen performances.

Critical acclaim
Levin's first "artistic" play was the comedy Solomon Grip, which premiered in May 1969 at the Open Theater under direction of Hillel Ne'eman. He achieved his first great public success with his next comedy, Hefez, which was mounted on the stage of the Haifa Theater in March 1972, directed by Oded Kotler. This play had previously been passed up by the Cameri and Habima. His next play, Ya'akobi and Leidental, the first that Levin also directed, was first presented in December 1972 at the Cameri Theater. During the 1970s, he continued to write and direct plays that primarily appeared at the Haifa Theater and Cameri (see the list of plays below). During this period Levin also wrote two screenplays: Floch, directed by Danny Wolman in 1972, and Fantasy on a Romantic Theme, directed by Vitek Tracz in 1977. The two movies earned the acclaim of critics, but not the public.

The next great tempest occurred in the wake of the play Job's Passion in 1981. The play included a scene in which the naked Job, in the person of Yosef Carmon, is impaled through his anus on a pole by the Caesar's soldiers, and is sold to a circus so that his death throes can draw a crowd. Miriam Taaseh-Glazer, at the time the Deputy Minister of Education and Culture, announced from the Knesset dais that the State need not fund a theater "where a naked guy hangs for ten minutes with all his privates waving around." Levin's next play, The Great Whore of Babylon (1982), aroused opposition even among his colleagues the Cameri Theater actors, chiefly Yossi Yadin. Following this opposition, the play was cut by 20 minutes.

Levin returned to political writing in The Patriot, which opened October 1982 at the Neve Zedek Theater, directed by Oded Kotler. The play is about an Israeli citizen who asks to emigrate to the United States. The American consul asks him to spit on his mother, kick an Arab boy's face, and afterward, to taunt God. Although the Council for Film and Drama Criticism banned the entire play, Kottler decided to present it. Yitzhak Zamir, then the government's legal counsel, recommended indictments against the theater management for transgressing censorship law. The play was allowed to go on only after it was edited.

During the 1980s, some of the critics charged that Levin was repeating material in his plays (Yakish and Poupche, Hamitlabet), although his later plays (The Dreaming Child, Those Who Walk in the Darkness, Repose, and others) received widespread acclaim.

In 1994, The Dreaming Child was adapted as a television film by noted Israeli director Ram Loevy. The opera The Child Dreams, composed by Gil Shohat, premiered in January 2010 on the occasion of the 25th anniversary of the Israeli Opera. Sets and costumes were designed by Gottfried Helnwein, and the production was directed by Omri Nitzan, Artistic Director of the Cameri Theater, who also helped Shohat adapt the play into the libretto.

Levin also wrote popular songs ("Mr. Almost and Mrs. Already" recorded by Yehudit Ravitz, "What Does the Bird Care" and "Not Enough Room for Two on the Electric Pole" recorded by Aharit Hayamim, "I Live From Day to Day" recorded by Rita, "London" recorded by Chava Alberstein); published two books of prose (The Eternal Invalid and the Beloved and A Man Stands Behind a Seated Woman) and a book of poetry (Life of the Dead); and composed and directed episodes of the TV show Layla Gov ("How We Played -Pranks of Chupak and Afchuk").

Dramatic themes and style
Nurit Yaari divides Levin's plays into three general categories, based on their themes, characters and theatrical forms:
 Satirical Cabarets – Levin’s early political pieces, “a straightforward reaction to the political reality prevailing at the time of their presentation…Levin’s cabarets are composed of a series of sketches interspersed with songs”
 Domestic Comedies – Plays focused on small, representative elements of society: individuals, families, friends and neighbors, “the dramatic space of these plays extends between the home, as the smallest unit, and the neighborhood. The city and country are not mentioned” In this group Yaari identifies three subcategories:
 Courtship and marriage
 A particular family
 A neighborhood.
 Spectacles of Doom – Levin’s philosophical and mythical works, which are usually based on ancient myths and biblical texts. These plays vary greatly in terms of plot, structure and the myths they draw upon, but habitually display similar themes such as: “the agonies and humiliations suffered by people” and “the futility of human suffering” as well as the recurring motifs of “degradation and death”

Awards and recognition
In 1994, Levin was the co-recipient (jointly with Meir Wieseltier) of the Bialik Prize for literature.

Levin's death brought new interest in his early stage works. The Israeli Theater Habimah performed several plays by Levin. An updated version of the political satire "You, Me and the Next War" was staged from 2004 through 2008 by the original crew with Bart Berman at the piano.

In 2000 the musician Dudi Levi released the disk Hanoch Levin Project, comprising eleven songs whose words Hanoch Levin composed.

Published works

Plays
 
Hefetz
Solomon Grip
Ya'akobi & Leidental
Young Varda'le
Schitz
Krum
Popper
The Rubber Merchants
Winter Funeral
Suitcase Packers
Execution
Job's Passion
The Great Whore of Babylon
The Lost Women of Troy
Everyone Wants to Live
Yakish & Poupche
Beaten and Defeated
The Labor of Life
The Hesitator
Dreaming Child
Hops & Hopla
The Wonderful Woman Inside Us
The Whore from Ohio
Mouth Open
The Conqueror
Beheading
Rape Trial
The Man with the Knife in the Middle
Elmo and Ruth
Anxious and Frightened
The People That Walked in Darkness
Murder
Must Be Punished
Singles
The Dreamer
The Perpetual Mourner
The Caretakers
The Emperor
Embarrassed
Shozes & Bjijina
Kludog the Miserable King
To Hold On and Never Let Go
Spasm and Twist
Redemption
And a Kiss for the Aunt
Emperor Gok
All the Queen's Men
A Servant's Devotion to his Rigorous Lady
Romantics
Requiem
Move my Heart

Sketches, revues and cabarets
You, me and the next war
Ketchup
Queen of a Bathtub
The Patriot
The Gigolo from Congo

Screenplays
Floch
'Fantasy on a Romantic ThemeProseThe Eternal Invalid and The BelovedA Man Stands Behind a Seated WomanPoetryThe Blessings of Dawn (1965)Friends' Party Poem (1967)Lives of the Dead (1980)As a Breeze Blows (1981)Farewell Rhymes to a Beloved (1998)Farewell Letters to a Beloved (1998)

Children's booksThe Happy, Cheerful CockUncle Max's Journey''

See also
List of Bialik Prize recipients
Theater of Israel
Culture of Israel

References

External links
 Biblical Thematics in Stage Design for the Hebrew Theatre Ben-Meir, Orna. Tel Aviv University.
 Hanoch Levin – Success Story article by Moti Sandak at Jewish-theater.com

 Hanoch Levin at Institute for Translation of Hebrew Literature.

1943 births
1999 deaths
Jews in Mandatory Palestine
Israeli people of Polish-Jewish descent
Jewish Israeli writers
Israeli male dramatists and playwrights
Israeli male poets
Jewish dramatists and playwrights
Tel Aviv University alumni
20th-century Israeli poets
20th-century Israeli dramatists and playwrights
Deaths from cancer in Israel
Deaths from prostate cancer
Burials at Kiryat Shaul Cemetery
Writers from Tel Aviv